Nivolas-Vermelle is a commune in the Isère department in southeastern France.

Geography
The Bourbre forms most of the commune's northeastern border.

Population

See also
Communes of the Isère department

References

Communes of Isère
Isère communes articles needing translation from French Wikipedia